K3 is a Belgian-Dutch girl group with a Dutch-language pop repertoire, consisting of Hanne Verbruggen, Marthe De Pillecyn and Julia Boschman. The group's name is derived from first letters of the three first members from 1998: Karen Damen, Kristel Verbeke and Kathleen Aerts. Their signature style and iconocity relies in all three girls mostly wearing the same outfit, and in the fact that each girl's hair represents one color in the Belgian flag. Throughout their career, K3 has built a space within Dutch and Belgian pop culture.

The rise to fame of K3 began with their running to represent Belgium in the 1999 Eurovision Song Contest with the single "Heyah Mama", eventually losing to Vanessa Chinitor's "Like the Wind". Despite receiving mixed reviews from the judges, the song peaked at two in Belgium (Ultratop 50 Singles) and at eighteen in The Netherlands. It was included in the debut album Parels (1999), which also met great commercial success in both countries. The band's rise to fame surprisingly came without any airplay from the regular music television channels like MTV and are directed towards kids and chose to market itself directly to children via cartoon television channels. The group later signed with Bertelsmann Music Group and released the albums Alle Kleuren (2000) and Tele-Romeo (2001).

In 2002, K3 departed ways with BMG and signed family entertainment production company Studio 100, opting for a more children-orientated direction. From 2002 to 2009 K3 recorded six more albums, all of them peaking at number one both in the Netherlands and Belgium, had their own children's television series called De Wereld Van K3 (2003-13), toured the Benelux eleven times with a total attendance of 1,7 million, and had starred in three cinema movies: K3 en het Magische Medaillon (2004), K3 en het IJsprinsesje (2006) and K3 en de Kattenprins (2007) that generated a $9,1 million revenue. Despite the outstanding success of the group, Kathleen Aerts stepped out of the formation in March 2009. She was replaced by Josje Huisman later that year after winning audition reality show K2 Zoekt K3.

The first single with Huisman as part of the group, "MaMaSé!", became a smash hit, peaking at number one for six consecutive weeks in The Netherlands and for seven weeks in Belgium. It listed in the top three of both countries' year-end charts. The album of the same name entered the year-end album chart in both countries in 2009, 2010 and 2011. With Huisman, K3 recorded five more albums, produced and starred in the first 3D-musical in the world, based in Lewis Carrol's Alice in Wonderland, taped two more movies: K3 Bengeltjes (2012), which became the group's highest-grossing film with a $5,1 million revenue, and K3 Dierenhotel (2014), and had their own sitcom series Hallo K3! (2011-12), which lasted three seasons, and K3 Kan Het! (2015).

On 18 March 2015 Damen, Verbeke and Huisman announced through a press conference that they were all leaving the group stating "since we started, we knew there would be a time which we would feel that it was the accurate moment to stop; well, that moment is now present". A second audition television show, K3 Zoekt K3, premiered in autumn to find the new K3 members. Hanne Verbruggen, Klaasje Meijer and Marthe De Pillecyn won the contest. Their first release, "10.000 Luchtballonnen" topped the charts in Belgium and The Netherlands. From 2015 to 2021, the group released six albums, starred in two more films: K3 Love Cruise (2017) and K3 Dans van de Farao (2020), had their own animated series De Avonturen van K3 (2016) and became television judges on seasons four and five of the Flemish version of The Voice Kids. In 2021, Meijer left the group and was later replaced with Julia Boschman.

Career

Rise to fame (1998-2002) 
The band K3 was started by Niels William. Initially, their intention was to be the Flemish version of the British all-female group "Spice Girls." Following the same formula K3 was composed of all females in their twenties, and like the Spice Girls, women in their twenties as their target audience. The original target is noticeable in their early song lyrics including their first single, "Wat ik wil" (What I want). This release was not very successful.

In 1999, K3 participated in live television shows that selected the Belgian entry for the Eurovision Song Contest with their song "Heyah Mama". The song was not well received by one of the judges, Marcel Vanthilt, who referred to the band members as "assorted meat products".
Notwithstanding, "Heyah Mama" was released as a single and became the first big hit for the band, staying at the number two spot of the Flemish Ultratop 50 chart, charting 25 weeks.
Their next two singles also earned the number one spot on the charts, resulting in an uninterrupted period of 32 weeks of K3 in the number one spot. About a year after becoming famous in Flanders, K3 also became famous in the Netherlands.

Their songs are written by Miguel Wiels, Alain Vande Putte and Peter Gillis. This trio previously collaborated as songwriters for Flemish singer Isabelle A.

K3 is noted for being the first pop act to break through to the top of the charts without receiving any airplay from the regular music television channels, such as MTV and TMF. Niels William's new marketing concept was based on promotion via children and cartoon channels such as Fox Kids.

Joining Studio 100 (2002-09) 
In 2002, Niels William sold the band to Studio 100, a Flemish television production company for Dutch and Belgian children's programs.

Songs like "Heyah Mama", "I love you baby", "Alle Kleuren" (All colours), "Blub, ik ben een vis!" (Blub, I'm a fish!), "Tele-Romeo", "Toveren" (Magic), "Verliefd"  (In love), "De 3 biggetjes" (The Three Little Piglets), "Oya lélé", "Hart verloren" (Lost heart), "Liefdeskapitein" (Captain of Love), "Kuma He", "Ya Ya Yippee", "Dokter Dokter" (Doctor doctor) and "Kusjesdag" (Kisses Day) were hits for the band. K3 has released nine albums. Their eighth album Ya Ya Yippee sold more than 50,000 copies in pre-sales within the Benelux. The ninth album, Kusjes (Kisses), sold 20,000.

K3 has a children's television program called De wereld van K3 (K3's World). Originally, there were Dutch and Flemish versions, but only the Dutch version remains.

The band has released several DVD's with video clips, musicals, films and with specially recorded footage like K3 in de Ardennen (K3 in the Ardennes).

In 2007, a team from Madame Tussauds in London took measurements of the band members for wax statues.
K3 unveiled these wax statues at Madame Tussauds Amsterdam on 4 July 2007.

On 10 May 2008, the band celebrated their 10-year anniversary with a new show 10 jaar K3 (10 years of K3). It was also celebrated in Plopsaland, a popular theme park for kids. They opened the K3 museum, in which there is an overview of their career. The museum's pieces include show outfits, interviews, and props from the movies, like the flying scooters from  K3 en het magische medaillon (K3 and the magic medallion), and their numerous gold and platinum records.

Line-up change (2009-10) 
On Monday 23 March 2009 Kathleen announced her departure at a press conference. "It was a tough decision, after all, I gave the best years of my life to K3. People change and life is constantly in motion; I'm 30 now and after ten years it's time to move on". She made her last two appearances with K3 in June at a Studio 100 showcase at the Rotterdam Ahoy. Karen and Kristel then searched for a replacement on television.

Belgian news program De Rode Loper reported that two celebrities were auditioning for the vacant spot but this turned out to be an April Fool's joke. Meanwhile, Kathleen has signed up for UNICEF ambassadorship and appears to have quit singing altogether, aside from small TV appearances such as: contestant on the Belgian edition of Masked Singer.

The two remaining members of K3 kept searching for a new member through a talent show called 'K2 zoekt K3' ('K2 searching for K3'). In the final episode, the Dutch Josje Huisman was chosen as the newest member of K3.

Further success (2010-14) 
In 2010, K3 shot new episodes for their kids-talkshow (this time with Josje) and also started their own sitcom called "Hello K3", in which they portray fictional versions of themselves living in the same building and trying to balance a normal life with being superstars. This creates comic situations reminiscent of the television series The Monkees and also Friends. The first season of sitcom aired on television in fall 2010. A new single with the same name was also released on 15 September, on the album Eyo!. Their sitcom was also renewed for a second season which premiered in the Netherlands and Belgium in September 2011. In 2012 they released their album Engeltjes (little angels) accompanied by their fourth movie K3 Bengeltjes. In 2013, they released their album Loko Le and their fifth movie K3 Dierenhotel (K3 Animalhotel).

In 2014 they also started a new unscripted TV-show, 'K3 kan het!' (K3 can do it!'), in which they travel through Belgium and the Netherlands to help children fulfill their dreams.

The new K3 (2015-2021) 
On 18 March 2015 it was announced that all current members were leaving the group. K3's label has announced that they'll look for new members in late 2015. A televised competition to determine who would become the new K3 started airing in the Netherlands and Belgium in August 2015. In November of that same year Hanne Verbruggen, Klaasje Meijer and Marthe De Pillecyn had been chosen as Karen, Kristel and Josje's successors (respectively) and would become the new K3.

Later it had also been revealed that Kristel Verbeke, one of the first members, would become their new manager. In June 2017 Verbeke announced that she would quit her role of manager.

An animated series based on the band was released in 2015.

Search for new member (2021) 
On 9 February 2021 member Klaasje announced her departure from K3. She fulfilled the 2021 group schedules up until the last quarter. The label, Studio 100, has announced a new member will be cast through a survival show similar to K2 zoekt K3 and K3 zoekt K3. For the first time, both sexes are qualified to join the group.

Members 

Former members

Temporary members

Diede van den Heuvel 
K2 zoekt K3 finalist Diede van den Heuvel stood in for pregnant member Hanne Verbruggen during the remaining Dutch shows of the 2022 tour.

Marie Verhulst 
For De Grote Sinterklaasshow in December 2022, Marie Verhulst stood in for Hanne Verbruggen during the last song.

Timeline

Musicals 
K3 has performed in several musicals. In Doornroosje (Sleeping Beauty), during 2002, they played three good fairies and in De 3 biggetjes (The Three Little Pigs) in 2003. They played the eponymous three pigs, Knirrie (Verbeke), Knarrie (Damen) and Knorrie (Aerts) and reprised these roles in 2007 for a tour of both Belgium and the Netherlands.

In 2011, they came back with a new musical, Alice In Wonderland with Josje Huisman, who had joined the group the previous year. The musical is the first live musical to use 3D projections. The production toured Belgium and the Netherlands in 2011.

K3 Museum 
On 10 June 2006, a party was held at Plopsaland to celebrate the tenth anniversary of Studio 100. At the event, the band members opened the K3 Museum which provides an overview of their career. There are interviews, clothes, and props from the films to be seen, including the air scooters from the film K3 en het Magische Medaillon (K3 and the magic medallion). Their gold and platinum certifications can also be seen.

Projects in other languages 
In 2002, K3 recorded English, French and German-language versions of their third album, Tele-Romeo.

After K3 founder Niels William sold the act to Studio 100 in 2002, he moved to South Africa and started his own music studio. In March 2004, he launched X4, a four-member girl group that sang translations of K3 songs in Afrikaans and English. This group released Heyah Mama, which featured a single of the same name.

In May 2007, Studio 100 launched Wir 3, a German version of K3 which sang translated versions of K3 songs and emulated the original band's style by casting a redhead, a brunette, and a blonde (also German colors).

In October 2017, Studio 100 launched My3, a Polish version of K3 with production group Tako Media and television broadcaster Polsat.

Band members in non-K3 activities 
Aerts played Snow White in the musical Sneeuwwitje (Snow White) and also played the lead role in De kleine zeemeermin (The Little Mermaid).

From February to May 2008 Verbeke appeared in the musical Pinokkio as Nina de Ballerina, the title character's conscience.

Damen plays a PE teacher in television series Het Huis Anubis (The House of Anubis) for the Dutch Nickelodeon channel.

In September 2007, Damen was a judge on the panel for the Junior Eurovision Song Contest.

After quitting K3, Aerts has released several solo albums and singles.

The band members have occasionally, separately, or collectively, taken part in the television program De Notenclub, which allowed them to produce content for a more adult audience. Miguel Wiels, who is the co-author of most of the K3 songs, is one of the two regular piano players in the Flemish version of the programme. Another songwriter for K3, Alain Vande Putte, has also appeared as a singer on the show.

Karen Damen is also a judge on 'Belgium's Got Talent'.

In 2014, Josje Huisman played the main character of the TV-series "Fashion Planet," where she portrayed a young intern for a prestigious fashion magazine. The show was canceled after one season.

In 2018, former member Karen Damen played a role in a movie made by a popular Dutch YouTuber, Dylan Haegens.

Discography

Studio albums
 Parels (1999)
 Alle kleuren (2000)
 Tele-Romeo (2001)
 Verliefd (2002)
 Oya lélé (2003)
 De wereld rond (2004)
 Kuma hé (2005)
 Ya ya yippee (2006)
 Kusjes (2007)
 MaMaSé! (2009)
 Eyo! (2011)
 Engeltjes (2012)
 Loko le (2013)
 10.000 Luchtballonnen (2015)
 Ushuaia (2016)
 Love Cruise (2017)
 Roller Disco (2018)
 Dromen (2019)
 Dans van de Farao (2020)
 Waterval (2021)
 Vleugels (2022)

Filmography 
The members of K3 have also starred in several theatrical films and TV specials. They usually portray fictional versions of themselves, having all kind of adventures.

In 2004, they released their first theatrical film: K3 en het Magische Medaillon (K3 and the magic medallion). The film premiered on 29 September 2004, and received favorable reviews. In the film, Dutch television celebrity Paul de Leeuw played the genie.

In 2006, the second theatrical film, K3 en het IJsprinsesje (K3 and the little ice princess), was released. In this fairy tale film Carry Tefsen played the witch at the pancake house, Peter Faber played the king and famous Belgian comedian Urbanus played the wizard. More than half a million people in Belgium and the Netherlands bought tickets.

The third theatrical film, K3 en de Kattenprins (K3 and the Catprince) had its Dutch premiere on 20 December 2007 and reached gold status (attendance in excess of 150,000 people) in two weeks' time.

On 12 December 2012 a fourth theatrical K3 movie, K3 Bengeltjes (K3 Little Dangles) was released in Belgium in the Netherlands. This was the first K3 movie without Kathleen, Josje's predecessor. The movie is connected to their sitcom, Hallo K3! (Hello K3!), and stars some of the same actors and characters.

On 12 February 2014 a fifth theatrical K3 movie, K3 Dierenhotel (K3 Animalhotel), was released in Belgium and the Netherlands. This is the second movie featuring Josje Huisman and also includes actors and characters from the sitcom.

Recordings of their musicals and concert shows are also available on DVD.

It was announced on 14 May 2020 that K3 will be filming a new feature film called "Dans van de Farao" (Dance of the Pharaoh).

See also
 List of best-selling Belgian artists
 X4 was the Afrikaner or South African version of K3 (2002-2005)
 Wir 3 (en. us three) was the German version of K3. (2007-2010)
 My3 (en. us three or we three) was the Polish version of K3. (2017-2020)

References

Other sources

External links 
 Official site K3 (Dutch)
 K3-lyrics Songtexts of K3
 
 
 
 
 
 
 
 
 Alistair MacLean, K3, flanderstoday.eu, 21 October 2009

Belgian pop music groups
Dutch girl groups
Musical groups established in 1998
Sony BMG artists